Louisiana Highway 1208 (LA 1208) is a collection of five state highways which serve Alexandria in Rapides Parish.



Louisiana Highway 1208-1 

Louisiana Highway 1208-1 (LA 1208-1) spans  from west to east and is known as Willow Glen River Road. LA 1208-1 begins at an intersection with I-49, starting at it as a frontage road. LA 1208-1 turns east towards LA 1 (Third Street). LA 1 heads north into downtown Alexandria, and south towards Marksville and Baton Rouge. LA 1208-1 used to extend along I-49 to US 71, but the latest DOTD maps show the highway shortened to only Willow Glen River Road.

Junction list

Louisiana Highway 1208-2 

Louisiana Highway 1208-2 (LA 1208-2) spans  in a west to east direction. It is known as Sterkx Rd. LA 1208-2 begins at an intersection with LA 488 near the community of Anandale.  It continues eastward towards MacArthur Drive, ending at an intersection with US 71 (MacArthur Drive/Jefferson Hwy). The road passes next to the DOTD District 08 headquarters along its entire route.

Junction list

Louisiana Highway 1208-3 

Louisiana Highway 1208-3 (LA 1208-3) spans  from west to east and is known as Jackson Street.  From the west, LA 1208-3 begins at an intersection with LA 488, known as Twin Bridges Road.  It heads in a northeastern direction, passing Alexandria Senior High School and enters a heavily traveled section, lined with fast food restaurants and grocery stores. LA 1208-3 then passes under US 71/165 at a modernized interchange.  It sheds two lanes to become a two-lane road through Alexandria's garden district, ending at an interchange with LA 1/28 BUS, with Jackson Street picking up the US 165 BUS designation.

Junction list

Louisiana Highway 1208-4 

Louisiana Highway 1208-4 (LA 1208-4) spans  from south to north and is known as Eddie Williams Avenue.  From the south, LA 1208-4 takes over for the former designation of LA 1208-1 along US 71. It then follows the route of I-49, truncating at the Sugarhouse Road exit for I-49. It was created in 2012.

Junction list

Louisiana Highway 1208-5 

Louisiana Highway 1208-5 (LA 1208-5) spans  from west to east and is known as Masonic Drive. LA 1208-5 begins at an intersection with US 71 and US 165 at the South Traffic Circle, and extends north along Masonic Drive. It passes next to Bringhurst Field and Silver Dollar Pawn, home of Cajun Pawn Stars, a reality show on the History Channel. LA 1208-5 ends at an intersection with US 167 Business. LA 1208-5 was originally a segment of Business US 165, which has been truncated to Pineville.

Junction list

Deleted and Changed Routes

Louisiana Highway 1208-4 (Upper Third Street) 

Louisiana Highway 1208-4 (LA 1208-4) spanned  from west to east and is known as Upper Third Street.  LA 1208-4 began at an intersection with US 71 and US 165 (Monroe Highway) just north of 71/165's intersection with I-49 and LA 28.  It continued eastward towards Rapides Regional Medical Center, ending at an intersection with US 165 Business (Jackson Street).

Junction list

References 

LADOTD Map of Numbered Highways in eastern Rapides Parish
Official Control Section Map - LADOTD District 08
Louisiana State Highway Log

1208
Transportation in Rapides Parish, Louisiana
Transportation in Alexandria metropolitan area, Louisiana